North Carolina Highway 34 (NC 34) is a short primary state highway in the U.S. state of North Carolina.

Route description
The route's southern terminus is the intersection with US 158 in the community of Belcross, in Camden County. From there, it progresses in a general northeastern direction through Hastings Corners, where it also becomes known as Shawboro Road. After uniting with Indiantown Road, NC 34 continues north to its northern terminus at NC 168 in Sligo, Currituck County.

History
Over the years since the 1930s, NC 34 has occupied a variety of routes in the northeastern part of North Carolina, including current-day NC 168, NC 343, NC 344, and US 158.

Major intersections

References

034
Historic Albemarle Tour
Transportation in Camden County, North Carolina
Transportation in Currituck County, North Carolina